Madrasa is the Arabic word for a school or educational institution. Alternative transliterations include or Madraza, Madraseh and Madrese. 

It may also refer to:

Films
 Madrasa (2013 film), an Afghan film
 Madraza (2017 film), an Argentine film

Places
 Madraseh, a village in Afghanistan
 Mədrəsə, a village in Azerbaijan

Other uses
 Madrasa (grape), a variety of grape